Khulda, also Khuldeh, was a Palestinian Arab village located  south of Ramla in the Mandatory Palestine. Known as Huldre to the Crusaders, it is also mentioned in documents dating to the periods of Mamluk, Ottoman, and Mandatory rule over Palestine. During the 1948 war, the village was depopulated as part of Operation Nachshon and was subsequently destroyed. The Israeli kibbutz of Mishmar David was established that same year on land belonging to the village.

History
Khulda lay close to a highway connecting Gaza to the Ramla-Jerusalem highway. During the Crusades, the village was known as Huldre.

During the period of Mamluk rule over Palestine, Mujir al-Din al-'Ulaymi narrates how the under-Governor of Ramleh in 1495 had to take refuge against marauding Bedouin in a small fort which then existed at Khulda.

Ottoman era
Khulda, like the rest of Palestine, was incorporated into the Ottoman Empire in 1517 and in 1596, it formed part of the nahiya ("subdistrict") of Ramla, in the liwa of Gaza. It had a population of 12  households, an estimated  sixty-six persons, all Muslim. They   paid a  fixed tax rate of 25% on agricultural products, including wheat, barley, beehives, and goats,  in addition to occasional revenues; a total of 4,500  akçe.

When Edward Robinson passed by in 1838, he described Khulda as "a large village" on a hill. It was also noted as a Muslim  village in the southern  area in the  District of Er-Ramleh.

In 1863 Victor Guérin noted a village with two hundred and fifty inhabitants, situated on a plateau.

An official village list of about 1870 showed that the village had 28 houses and a population of 76, though the population count included only men.  Charles Simon Clermont-Ganneau visited Khulda in 1871, and was told by the inhabitants that the village used to be surrounded by a fortified wall, two gates of which were still supposed to be in situ. Clermont-Ganneau noted that this agreed well with what Mujir al-Din had written about the place.

In 1882, the PEF's Survey of Western Palestine (SWP)  described   Khulda  as a large village, built of stone and mud, situated on a hill. The village had a masonry well to the east.

British Mandate era

During British rule over Mandate Palestine, ten labourers from Khulda worked gratis for the Jewish National Fund on the Khulde drainage project, most of which took place on the Arab village's lands. The project, like others of its kind was essential to Jewish settlement in Palestine, as malaria had impeded permanent settlement at Jewish Khulde in 1921.

In the  1922 census of Palestine, Khulda  had a population of 53 inhabitants, all  Muslims,   increasing in the  1931 census to 178, still all Muslims, in  29 inhabited houses.

The villagers maintained a mosque and there were two water wells for domestic use.  Villagers in Khulda were engaged in the rearing of animal livestock. The Lydda District had one of the largest animal markets in Palestine, alongside that of the Nazareth District; however, starvation was a common affliction among the herds in the former in the 20th century, and the herd at Khulda was described as 'a typical specimen of extreme debility'.

In the 1945 statistics, the population had grown to 280 Muslims, with a total of 9,461  dunams of land. Of this, a total of 8,994 dunums  were used for cereals, 9 dunums were irrigated or used for orchards,  while 8 dunams were classified as built-up public areas.

1948 and aftermath

Prior to the outbreak of the 1948 Arab-Israeli war, Khulda was conquered by Jewish forces on April 6, 1948 during Operation Nachshon. On April 20, 1948 it was leveled by bulldozers.

Andrew Petersen, an archaeologist specializing in Islamic architecture visited Khulda in 1993, and notes that the remains of at least four stone buildings can be seen, although only two of them are standing. The first of these is a rectangular structure ( x ) with two separate rooms, each with its own entrance. Each door is flanked with two large windows. Both doors and windows are covered with lintels, above which is a relieving arch. An inscription above one of the doors have been removed. The roof is made with iron girders, with reinforced concrete, while the walls are dressed limestone. According to Petersen, the building must have served some public purpose, and it probably dates from the final years of the Ottoman rule, or the early British Mandate of Palestine period.

The second building stands north of first one, and is about half in size (6 m x 6 m). The roof is made in the same manner as the first house. The walls are made of boulders and rubble stone, joined together with mud mortar. A shallow niche in the south wall might be a mihrab. The walls are decorated with stencilled friezes of palm tree and palmettes in blue-green. A barely legible inscription above the door gives a 14th-century AH (late 19th-century CE) date.

References

Bibliography

External links
Welcome To Khulda
Khulda, Zochrot
Survey of Western Palestine, Map 16:   IAA, Wikimedia commons
Khulda, from the Khalil Sakakini Cultural Center

Arab villages depopulated prior to the 1948 Arab–Israeli War
District of Ramla